Billy McEwan may refer to:

Billy McEwan (footballer, born 1914) (1914–1991), Scottish footballer
Billy McEwan (footballer, born 1951) (1951–2022), Scottish footballer and manager